Michael Kessler (born October 23, 1954) is an American artist.

Art 

Kessler makes nature-based paintings that merge geometric elements with biomorphism. He began his art career as a landscape painter. While still an undergraduate at Kutztown University Kessler received a fellowship from the Whitney Museum of American Art to study and produce art in New York City at the Whitney Independent Study Program. During this period (1977–78) he met many important artist working in New York City including Richard Tuttle and Dorothea Rockburne. Influenced by the paintings of Brice Marden and Elizabeth Murray as well as the music of Philip Glass and Steve Reich he began experimenting with his own work. His paintings soon became fully non-objective. Kessler's works are characterized by large fields of diaphanous color that are activated by organic linear structures that have been visually and physically woven into a grid structure which consists of thick slabs of paint. These organic linear structures are overlapped and punctuated by dendritic growth patterns that suggest the bending of time and space. All of these visual elements as well as the color combinations have been carefully extracted from nature over time through prolonged observation and then reconstructed and orchestrated to transmit the dynamics of the Natural World. In this way Kessler synthesizes disparate elements into a new kind of harmony.

In 1991 after returning from a year in Italy (via. the Rome Prize) Kessler became very involved with large-scale, site-specific installations. Gallery owner Chris Schmidt (Schmidt/Dean Gallery, Philadelphia) worked with Kessler to initiate this project by obtaining a commission from Arlen Specter for Kessler's first site-specific work which was installed in Senator Specter's office at the Hart Senate Office Building in Washington, D.C. In Chicago Kessler continued this pursuit with Gallery owner Paul Klein who also got involved with the placement of site-specific works in his gallery Klein Art Works.

Education 
Bachelor of Fine Arts degree from Kutztown University.

Kessler attended the Independent Study Program at the Whitney Museum of American Art

Awards 

 Winner of the Rome Prize, 1991
 Winner of the Pollock-Krasner Award, 1992, This is a grant for painting set up and administered by the Pollock/ Krasner Foundation.
 Winner of the "Awards in the Visual Arts-5" grant in painting, 1985
 Winner of the Pennsylvania Council on the Arts grant in painting, 1983

Public collections 
His paintings are held in 25 museum collections including:

 The Brooklyn Museum
 The Albright-Knox Art Gallery
 The Museum of Fine Arts in Boston
 The Broad Art Foundation in Los Angeles
 The New Museum in New York City

Gallery exhibitions 
Since 1983 his paintings have been shown in over two hundred exhibitions throughout the United States and Europe.
 Five solo shows at the Jack Tilton Gallery in New York City.
 Solo Exhibition at Ann Korologos Gallery in Basalt, Colorado (Gallery is owned by former Secretary of Labor, Ann Korologos).
 Gallery Bienvenu, New Orleans, Louisiana
 Madison Gallery, La Jolla, California
 Paia Contemporary Gallery, Maui, Hawaii
 Schmidt Dean Gallery, Philadelphia, Pennsylvania
 Lanoue Fine Art, Boston, Massachusetts
 Sense Fine Art, Menlo Park, California
 Allentown Art Museum, Allentown, Pennsylvania
 Castellani Art Museum, Niagara Falls, New York

References

General references 

Inner Nature by Nancy Doll
New Work, New York, Outside New York at the New Museum
Geoform interview by Julie Karabenick
Art News review by Richard Speer

External links 
 
 Kessler on Artnet
 Rome Prize article in the Reading Eagle
 "Cool Violence in Layers of Glowing Technicolor", the Morning Call
 "Year in Italy Catapults Kessler's Work", Chicago Tribune
 "Nature in the Abstract", Newsday, Long Island, N.Y.
 "David Ebony's New York Top Ten", Artnet Magazine

1954 births
Living people
American artists
Place of birth missing (living people)
Kutztown University of Pennsylvania alumni